Long Branch is a  long 3rd order tributary to Lawsons Creek in Halifax County, Virginia.

Course 
Long Branch rises in Alton, Virginia and then flows northwest and to join Lawsons Creek about 1.5 miles southeast of Turbeville.

Watershed 
Long Branch drains  of area, receives about 45.8 in/year of precipitation, has a wetness index of 385.81, and is about 50% forested.

See also 
 List of Virginia Rivers

References

Watershed Maps 

Rivers of Virginia
Rivers of Halifax County, Virginia
Tributaries of the Roanoke River